Maki may refer to:

People
Mäki, a Finnish surname (includes a list of people with the name)
Maki (name), a Japanese given name and surname (includes a list of people with the name)

Places
Maki, Ravar, Kerman Province, Iran
Maki, Rigan, Kerman Province, Iran
Maki, Razavi Khorasan, Iran
Maki, Niigata (Nishikanbara), a former town in Niigata Prefecture, Japan
Maki, Niigata (Higashikubiki), a former village in Niigata Prefecture, Japan
Mąki, Poland

Political parties
Maki (political party), the Communist Party of Israel
Maki (historical political party), the original Communist Party of Israel

Food
Maki roll or makizushi, a style of sushi wrapped in dried seaweed
Norimaki, a class of Japanese foods wrapped in dried seaweed
Maki mi (or maki soup), a Chinese-Filipino pork tenderloin soup

Other uses
Maki Engineering, a Grand Prix racing constructor
 , the name of several ships
Ring-tailed lemur, or maky/maki, a primate

See also

Makki (disambiguation)